Tal-e Afghani (also Romanized as Tal-e Afghānī, Tal-e Afghānī, and Tol Afghānī) is a village in Rostam-e Yek Rural District, in the Central District of Rostam County, Fars Province, Iran. At the 2006 census, its population was 517, in 99 families.

References 

Populated places in Rostam County